Zachary Quinn Crouch (born October 26, 1965) is a former relief pitcher in Major League Baseball who played briefly for the Boston Red Sox during the 1988 season.

Crouch, a 6'3", 180 lb. left-handed specialist, was selected by the Boston Red Sox in third round of the 1984 amateur draft. He pitched at five different minor league levels from 1985 to 1988 before joining the big team.

In 102 minor league games, Crouch posted a 27–31 record with a 3.63 ERA in 533.2 innings pitched. In three major league appearances, he recorded a 6.75 ERA without a decision in  innings.

Sources

Boston Red Sox players
Major League Baseball pitchers
Baseball players from California
Winter Haven Red Sox players
1965 births
Living people
People from Folsom, California
Greensboro Hornets players
New Britain Red Sox players
Pawtucket Red Sox players